In geometry, the truncated heptagonal tiling is a semiregular tiling of the hyperbolic plane. There are one triangle and two tetradecagons on each vertex. It has Schläfli symbol of t{7,3}. The tiling has a vertex configuration of 3.14.14.

Dual tiling 
     
The dual tiling is called an order-7 triakis triangular tiling, seen as an order-7 triangular tiling with each triangle divided into three by a center point.

Related polyhedra and tilings 
This hyperbolic tiling is topologically related as a part of sequence of uniform truncated polyhedra with vertex configurations (3.2n.2n), and [n,3] Coxeter group symmetry.

From a Wythoff construction there are eight hyperbolic uniform tilings that can be based from the regular heptagonal tiling. 

Drawing the tiles colored as red on the original faces, yellow at the original vertices, and blue along the original edges, there are eight forms.

See also 

 Truncated hexagonal tiling
 Heptagonal tiling
 Tilings of regular polygons
 List of uniform tilings

References
 John H. Conway, Heidi Burgiel, Chaim Goodman-Strass, The Symmetries of Things 2008,  (Chapter 19, The Hyperbolic Archimedean Tessellations)

External links 

 Hyperbolic and Spherical Tiling Gallery
 KaleidoTile 3: Educational software to create spherical, planar and hyperbolic tilings
 Hyperbolic Planar Tessellations, Don Hatch

Heptagonal tilings
Hyperbolic tilings
Isogonal tilings
Semiregular tilings
Truncated tilings